Nicolae Mihalcea (20 November 1922 – 22 November 2018) was a Romanian equestrian. He competed at the 1952 Summer Olympics and the 1956 Summer Olympics.

References

External links
 

1922 births
2018 deaths
Romanian male equestrians
Romanian dressage riders
Olympic equestrians of Romania
Equestrians at the 1952 Summer Olympics
Equestrians at the 1956 Summer Olympics
People from Zărnești